Pseudochariesthes nigroguttata is a species of beetle in the family Cerambycidae. It was described by Per Olof Christopher Aurivillius in 1908. It contains the varietas Pseudochariesthes nigroguttata var. blairi.

References

Tragocephalini
Beetles described in 1908